Two regiments of the British Army have been numbered the 117th Regiment of Foot:

117th Regiment of Foot (Invalids), raised in 1762 and renumbered as the 74th in 1763
117th Regiment of Foot (1794), raised in 1794